The Norwegian Union of Planing Workers was a trade union representing workers in saw mills and related fields in Norway.

The union was founded on 1 September 1911, as the Norwegian Sawmill, Site and Planing Workers' Union, a split from the Norwegian Union of General Workers.  It affiliated to the Norwegian Confederation of Trade Unions.  By 1924, the union had 3,882 members.

In 1949, the union merged into the Norwegian Union of Building Workers, which renamed itself as the "Norwegian Union of Building Industry Workers".

Presidents
1912: Andreas Juell
1915: Hans Eriksen
1945: John Wivegh

References

Defunct trade unions of Norway
Norwegian Confederation of Trade Unions
Trade unions established in 1911
Trade unions disestablished in 1949
Building and construction trade unions